Jonathan Germán "JoGo" Gómez Mendoza (born September 1, 2003) is an American professional soccer player who plays as a left-back for Spanish club Real Sociedad B. Born in the United States to Mexican parents, he has one previous friendly cap for the Mexico national team but has most recently represented the United States national team with multiple friendly caps.

Youth soccer
Gómez joined the FC Dallas academy in 2016 at the age of 12. He progressed through the ranks starting with the U-13 side as a left winger. During his three years with the FCD academy he transitioned to playing fullback. After three years with the academy Gómez signed an amateur contract with FC Dallas's reserve side North Texas SC in USL League One at the age of 15. During his time with North Texas, Gómez appeared in eight league matches and tallied 2 assists as part of their title-winning campaign in the 2019 USL League One season.

Professional career

Louisville City 
On March 5, 2020, Louisville City FC announced that it had signed Gómez to a professional contract. Gómez proceeded to appear 36 times in the USL Championship and score two goals in his bid to set a precedent within the club as a youth development player. At the end of the 2021 USL Championship season, Gómez was named the 2021 USL Championship Young Player of the Year and also named to the USL Championship's All-League First Team.

Real Sociedad 
On September 30, 2021, Real Sociedad announced an agreement with Louisville City for the transfer of Gómez, with the player signing a contract until 2025 and being initially assigned to Real Sociedad B in Segunda División.

On March 2, 2022, Gómez was included in Real Sociedad's La Liga matchday squad for the first time against RCD Mallorca.

International career 
Gómez was born and raised in the United States to Mexican parents and has been extensively pursued by the national team federations of both countries. He represented both the United States and Mexico at the U16 level, including winning the 2019 UEFA Development Tournament and 2019 Nike International Friendlies with the United States U16s and third place at the 2019 Nordic Cup with Mexico U16s.

Gómez was a non-roster trainee with Mexico during their loss to the United States in the 2021 CONCACAF Nations League Finals. Gómez was subsequently named to the United States provisional squad for the 2021 CONCACAF Gold Cup although he did not make the final roster as the United States won the Final over Mexico. In October 2021, Gómez played in a pair of friendlies for Mexico U20s in Europe.

On December 3, 2021, Gómez was called up to the United States national team for a friendly match against Bosnia and Herzegovina. On December 18, Gómez made his senior international debut as an 84th minute substitute and his shot on goal was rebounded in by Cole Bassett for the United States' 1–0 victory.

On April 21, 2022, Gómez was called up to the Mexico national team for a friendly match against Guatemala on April 27, in which he was subbed on in the 82nd minute. He thus became the fourth player to be capped by both the United States and Mexico senior national teams. Because both matches were friendlies, Gómez was not cap-tied to either nation.

In May 2022, Gómez was named to the provisional squads of both the United States U20s and Mexico U20s for the 2022 CONCACAF U-20 Championship but could not participate for either nation due to injury. After the United States U20s won the tournament to qualify for the 2023 FIFA U-20 World Cup and 2024 Olympics while Mexico U20s did not qualify for either, Gómez was called up in September 2022 to the United States U20s for the 2022 Revelations Cup in Mexico. Gómez played in all three of the United States U20s' friendlies including against Mexico U20s.

On January 18, 2023, Gómez was called up for the second time to the United States national team for friendly matches against Serbia and Colombia and made his first senior international start against Serbia.

Personal life
He is the younger brother of soccer player Johan Gomez, who formerly played for North Texas SC before moving to FC Porto.

Career statistics

Club

Honors
North Texas SC
USL League One Regular Season Title: 2019
USL League One Championship: 2019

Individual
USL Championship All League First Team: 2021
USL Championship Young Player of the Year: 2021

References

External links
 

2003 births
Living people
Sportspeople from Arlington, Texas
Mexican footballers
Mexico international footballers
Mexico youth international footballers
American soccer players
United States men's international soccer players
United States men's youth international soccer players
American sportspeople of Mexican descent
Association football fullbacks
North Texas SC players
Louisville City FC players
Soccer players from Texas
USL League One players
USL Championship players
Real Sociedad B footballers
Mexican expatriate footballers
Mexican expatriate sportspeople in Spain
American expatriate soccer players
American expatriate sportspeople in Spain
Expatriate footballers in Spain
Dual internationalists (football)